Miss Construction was a German electronic music band from Berlin.

History
Miss Construction was formed by singer Chris Pohl in 2008. The band's first release was “Totes Fleisch”, a cover from Terminal Choice. This was followed by their debut album Kunstprodukt, released on 28 April 2008 by Out of Line sublabel Fear Section. The Project was debuted at WGT 2008 in Leipzig. In November 2013 the band released its second full-length album United Trash - The Z Files via Out of Line Music. As for now, Gordon had retired from music, and Chris doesn't want to work on Miss Construction alone.

Current members
Chris Pohl - Male voice, programming, and lyrics
Gordon Mocznay - Voice, programming and lyrics

Discography

Albums
 2008: Kunstprodukt
 2013: United Trash - The Z Files.

Videos
 2008: Kunstprodukt
 2013: Electrotanz.

Appearances on compilation albums
 2008: Pornostar (on New Signs & Sounds 04/08)
 2008: Kunstprodukt (on Extreme Sündenfall 7)
 2008: F**k Me Too (on Awake The Machines Vol. 6)
 2010: Zombiefield (on Industrial For The Masses Vol. 4) 
 2011: Disco Schlampen (on Awake the Machines Vol. 7).

Remixes
 2009: Blutengel - World Of Ice (Clubfire Remix on Soultaker)
 2009: Wynardtage - I'm Not Your God (Not Your God Remix on Walk With The Shadows)
 2011: Dance Or Die - Friendly Fire (MC Remix on Nostradamnation).

References

External links
 Artist Info by Discogs
 

German electronic music groups
German industrial music groups
Musical groups from Berlin